Big Island Lake Cree Nation ( mistikoskâw-sâkahikan, meaning many trees lake) is a Cree First Nation in Saskatchewan, Canada. They have reserved for themselves one reserve, also called Big Island Lake Cree Nation, within Rural Municipality of Beaver River No. 622.

History

Chief Joseph Bighead signed adhesion to Treaty 6 on 25 June 1913 as Big Island Lake Cree Nation also referred to as Lac Des Isles. Indian Agents got into the habit of referring Big Island Lake as Joseph Bighead’s Band so the name stuck until 2000 when Indian Affairs was reminded to call the Band Big Island Lake Band by its original name of Big Island Lake Cree Nation and its Territory as signed at Treaty Adhesion! Chief Joseph Bighead - Atinistikwan was a leader that choose not to follow anyone and he and his Band continue to be independent of any Tribal Council or Federation believing membership serves to diminish Treaty Rights.

References

First Nations in Saskatchewan
Division No. 17, Saskatchewan